Chamaeleo is a genus of chameleons in the family Chamaeleonidae. Most species of the genus Chamaeleo are found in sub-Saharan Africa, but a few species are also present in northern Africa, southern Europe, and southern Asia east to India and Sri Lanka.

Description
Species in the genus Chamaeleo are slow moving, with independently movable eyes, the ability to change skin colouration, a long tongue, usually a prehensile tail, and special leg adaptations for grasping vegetation. Males are generally larger and more colorful than females.

Behavior
The vast majority of Chamaeleo species are arboreal and typically found in trees or bushes, but a few species (notably the Namaqua Chameleon) are partially or largely terrestrial.

Reproduction
The genus Chamaeleo includes only oviparous species.

In captivity
With few exceptions, the chameleons most commonly seen in captivity are all members of the genus Chamaeleo; the most commonly found species in the pet trade (as well as through captive breeders) include the common, Senegal, and veiled chameleons, but all chameleons tend to require special care, and are generally suited to the intermediate or advanced reptile keeper.

Taxonomy
Chamaeleo is the type genus of the family Chamaeleonidae.

All other genera of the subfamily Chamaeleoninae (Bradypodion, Calumma, Furcifer, Kinyongia, Nadzikambia, and Trioceros) have at some point been included in the genus Chamaeleo, but are now regarded as separate genera by virtually all authorities.

Extant species
14 species are recognized as being valid, and subspecies are recognized for some species.

Nota bene: A binomial authority or trinomial authority in parentheses indicates that the species or subspecies was originally described in a genus other than Chamaeleo.

Fossils

References

Further reading
Branch, Bill (2004). Field Guide to Snakes and other Reptiles of Southern Africa. Third Revised edition, Second impression. Sanibel Island, Florida: Ralph Curtis Books. 399 pp. . (Genus Chamaeleo, p. 227).
Laurenti JN (1768). Specimen medicum, exhibens synopsin reptilium emendatam cum experimentis circa venena et antidota reptilium austriacorum. Vienna: "Joan. Thom. Nob. de Trattnern". 214 pp. + Plates I-V. (Chamaeleo, new genus, p. 45). (in Latin).
Spawls S, Howell K, Drewes R, Ashe J (2002). A Field Guide to the Reptiles of East Africa. Köln, Germany: Academic Press. 544 pp. .

External links

 http://www.chameleoninfo.com/Species_Profiles.html

 
Taxa named by Josephus Nicolaus Laurenti
Lizard genera